1-Phosphatidylinositol-4,5-bisphosphate phosphodiesterase delta-1 is an enzyme that in humans is encoded by the PLCD1 gene.
PLCd1 is essential to maintain homeostasis of the skin.

See also
Phospholipase C

References

Further reading

External links
 WikiGenes entry for PLCD1

EC 3.1.4
EF-hand-containing proteins